The Anna Nielsen Scofield House, located at 2788 U.S. Route 89 in Fish Haven, Idaho, is a historic Queen Anne-style house built in 1896.  It was expanded in c. 1910.  Also known as the Watts House, it was listed on the National Register of Historic Places in 1999.

It is an irregular-plan balloon-frame house on a brick foundation.

In its NRHP nomination, it was deemed to be "an excellent and locally significant example of a rural Folk Victorian dwelling. It serves to illustrate the evolution of a typical rural dwelling during the prosperity, depression and recovery of the local agricultural economy during the first half of the 20th century. It is also one for the few remaining examples of this type of rural dwelling in its community."

References

Houses on the National Register of Historic Places in Idaho
Queen Anne architecture in Idaho
Houses completed in 1896
Bear Lake County, Idaho